Bugs' Bonnets is a 1956 Warner Bros. Merrie Melodies cartoon, directed by Chuck Jones and written by Tedd Pierce. The short was released on January 14, 1956. It features the voice talents of Mel Blanc, providing the voice of Bugs Bunny, as well as the uncredited performance of Arthur Q. Bryan (Elmer Fudd).

The film has both Bugs and Elmer constantly change social roles and personas, based on a series of hats which land on their heads. The film ends with Bugs and Elmer marrying each other, and moving to a cottage. It is a humorous depiction of a same-sex marriage.

Plot
At the beginning, the narrator explains how clothes strongly affect people's behavior.  For an example, a typical businessman's suit is replaced with a pirate outfit, causing him to act like one ("Batten down the keelhaul! Kill the women and children first! Blood!! Gore!! Spit 'em on the tatters!"). The narrator then adds how sometimes one piece of clothing, like a hat, can change somebody's behavior. Elmer Fudd is next seen in "boring regular old fashioned everyday clothes". He quickly has his bowler hat replaced with a hunter's cap, which makes him act like a hunter ("Bang! Bang! Bang! Come out of your holes, you cowardwy wabbits...and I'll bwow you to smitherweenies!!").  The scene then focuses on him chasing Bugs, wanting to see the color of Bugs' "spurting blood."

To allow the audience to explore this phenomenon some more, a truck for the "Acme Theatrical Hat Co.", going uphill, allows its loose doors to fly open, which in turn, allows all the hats inside to fly out all over the valley. An army helmet lands on Bugs' head, bearing Technical Sergeant stripes. Bugs suddenly adopts the authoritative behavior of such, proceeds to berate Elmer for hunting rabbits instead of the enemy, and orders Elmer to "forward march" off the river bank, where many of the hats are.

Upon emerging from the river, Elmer comes up wearing the hat, glasses and corncob pipe of General Douglas MacArthur, paraphrasing his famous line by saying, "I have wetuwned!" When Elmer starts menacingly approaching him, Bugs quickly digs a hole into the ground and loses his sergeant helmet, which now straddles the rabbit hole. Elmer slips under water for a second, coming up wearing his hunter's hat again.

Bugs emerges from burrowing under a game warden hat. Elmer shoots at the sergeant helmet, thinking Bugs is wearing it. Bugs, now a game warden, chastises Elmer for shooting sergeants out of season. A gust of wind blows both hats away. A pilgrim hat lands on Elmer, who explains: "I was just shooting turkeys for the first Thanksgiving dinner." Meantime, an Indian headdress lands on Bugs, who adopts a stereotyped Indian war whoop, takes the gun away from Elmer, and a short-lived chase ensues.

During this, the hats fall off; Elmer, returning to his original form, snatches his gun back from Bugs, and gives chase; the chase continues to a busy highway. Bugs scampers across, with Elmer stuck on other side. Suddenly, a little old lady's bonnet lands on Elmer, making him act like one. Meantime, a Boy Scout hat lands on Bugs. Bugs announces his duties as a Boy Scout and helps Elmer cross the street. A passing car spins them both around, the hats fly off, and the chase resumes.

Elmer blasts away at a crevice where Bugs is hiding. When Bugs comes behind Elmer from the other side of the rock, the rabbit is wearing a "gangster" fedora in the vein of Edward G. Robinson, and starts to threaten Elmer. Right then a cop's hat lands on Elmer, who then starts to collar Bugs; the "gangster"  slips him $10,000 as a bribe. Elmer initially refuses the bribe, but before he can hand it back, Bugs' hat is replaced by a British judge's wig. In response to Elmer's "bribe", Bugs sentences Elmer to "only" 45 years and hard labor, out of consideration to his family.

Shortly after Bugs walks away, he starts lamenting how he cannot abide a dishonest police officer. Elmer, now wearing a bridal veil, calls out: "Oh, Judge, wiww you mawwy me?" A top hat falls on Bugs, and he accepts the proposal. As with Rabbit of Seville, the "Wedding March" by Mendelssohn plays in the underscore, as Bugs is carrying Elmer toward a cottage. Bugs says to the audience: "Ya know, I think it always helps a picture to have a romantic ending." as the cartoon irises out.

Voice Characterizations 
 Mel Blanc as Bugs Bunny (voice)
 Arthur Q. Bryan as Elmer Fudd (voice, uncredited)

Reaction
Reaction to the film has been mixed. Reviews on Letterboxd were more positive than negative, in Rate Your Music they received a 3 star average rating. Film Music Central also rated it very positively.

Animation historian Michael Barrier said of the film in a Funnyworld magazine essay over Chuck Jones:

The preciosity that destroyed some of Jones' earliest cartoons . . . giving them a mincing, self-conscious quality . . . shows up [in] Bugs' Bonnets, a dreary exposition on the notion that the hat one wears shapes one's personality.

Home media
Bugs' Bonnets is available on the four-disc DVD box set Looney Tunes Golden Collection: Volume 5, as well as the similar, two-disc DVD Looney Tunes Spotlight Collection: Volume 5.

References

Sources
 Bugs' Bonnets at the Internet Movie Database.
 Funnyworld No. 13 (1971).

External links
 Bugs' Bonnets at the Internet Movie Database

1956 films
1956 animated films
1956 short films
1950s LGBT-related films
Merrie Melodies short films
Warner Bros. Cartoons animated short films
Short films directed by Chuck Jones
1950s English-language films
Films scored by Milt Franklyn
Cultural depictions of Douglas MacArthur
Bugs Bunny films
Elmer Fudd films
1950s Warner Bros. animated short films
Films produced by Edward Selzer
Films about hunters
Scouting in popular culture
Same-sex marriage in film